Ron Sparks (born November 23, 1974) is an American mixed martial artist, who formerly competed in Bellator's  Strikeforce K-1  King of the cage   Revolution fight league American fight league Heavyweight division.

Background
Born and raised in Louisville, Kentucky, Sparks was introduced to combat sports through his father, a Vietnam War veteran who also worked as a martial arts instructor in the military. Sparks himself began training when he was seven years old, before transitioning into kickboxing when he was a teenager and became a sparring partner for various local boxers and kickboxers. Sparks then embarked on his own career in kickboxing, before finally switching over to MMA.  Sparks is also owner of a general contracting company, A-Ron Construction.  A-Ron Construction is based in Louisville, Kentucky; servicing all aspects of home improvement needs.

Early career
Sparks made his professional MMA debut on June 17, 2006, defeating Heath Zimmerman via KO at Caged Inferno 2. Following this impressive win, Sparks would compile an undefeated record of 5-0 before being signed by Bellator MMA in June 2010.

Bellator MMA
Sparks made his Bellator debut in his hometown of Louisville, Kentucky at Bellator 30, which he won by knockout after just 50 seconds. He then fought veteran Vince Lucero at Bellator 43 on May 7, 2011, which he won via first-round submission.

Sparks entered into the Bellator Season Five Heavyweight Tournament. In the opening round, he faced Mark Holata at Bellator 52 and won via knockout in the first round. Sparks then faced Eric Prindle in the semifinals and lost via knockout in the first round.

Sparks will compete in the Bellator Season Seven Heavyweight Tournament, and was expected to face Mark Godbeer in the quarterfinals at Bellator 75.

Sparks faced Vitaly Minakov on June 19, 2013 at Bellator 96 in the opening round of the Heavyweight Tournament. He lost the fight via TKO in the first round.

Sparks made his next appearance for Bellator at Bellator 105 on October 25, 2013, facing fellow kickboxer Mighty Mo. Sparks lost via submission in the first round.

Sparks was released from Bellator on August 25, 2014.

Other promotions
Sparks was expected to face Josh Walker at Hardrock MMA 60 on February 1, 2014. However, in the weeks leading up to the event, the fight was taken off of the card for unknown reasons. Sparks was expected to face Jeremy May on September 20, 2014 at Square Ring Promotions: Island Fights 30. However, the fight was cancelled for unknown reasons.

Mixed martial arts record

|-
|Loss
|align=center|8–3
| Mighty Mo
|Submission (Keylock)
| Bellator 105
| 
|align=center|1
|align=center|2:52
| Rio Rancho, New Mexico, United States
|
|-
|Loss
|align=center|8–2
| Vitaly Minakov
|TKO (punches)
| Bellator 96
| 
|align=center|1
|align=center|0:32
| Thackerville, Oklahoma, United States
| Bellator Summer Series 2013 Heavyweight Tournament Semifinal
|-
|Loss
|align=center|8–1
| Eric Prindle
| KO (punch) 
| Bellator 56
| 
|align=center| 1
|align=center| 0:40
|Kansas City, Kansas, United States
| Bellator Season Five Heavyweight Tournament Semifinal
|-
|Win
|align=center|8–0
| Mark Holata
| KO (punches)
| Bellator 52
| 
|align=center| 1
|align=center| 1:24
|Lake Charles, Louisiana, United States
| Bellator Season Five Heavyweight Tournament Quarterfinal
|-
| Win
|align=center| 7–0
| Vince Lucero
| Submission (Keylock)
| Bellator 43
| 
|align=center| 1
|align=center| 2:18
|Newkirk, Oklahoma, United States
| 
|-
| Win
|align=center| 6–0
| Gregory Maynard
| KO (punch)
| Bellator 30
| 
|align=center| 1
|align=center| 0:50
|Louisville, Kentucky, United States
| 
|-
| Win
|align=center| 5–0
| Johnathan Ivey
| Decision (unanimous)
| RFL: Maximum Impact
| 
|align=center| 4
|align=center| 5.00
|Hammond, Indiana, United States
| 
|-
| Win
|align=center| 4–0
| Geoffrey Meisner
| TKO (punches)
| Colosseo Championship Fighting
| 
|align=center| 1
|align=center| 1:07
|Edmonton, Alberta, Canada
| 
|-
| Win
|align=center| 3–0
| TC Shane
| KO (punches)
| Caged Inferno 3
| 
|align=center| 1
|align=center| 0:36
|Louisville, Kentucky, United States
| 
|-
| Win
|align=center| 2–0
| Aaron Schenk
| TKO (punches)
| Clash in the Cage 1
| 
|align=center| 1
|align=center| 0:24
|Lawrenceburg, Kentucky, United States
| 
|-
| Win
|align=center| 1–0
| Heath Zimmerman
| KO (punches)
| Caged Inferno 2
| 
|align=center| 1
|align=center| 0:17
|Louisville, Kentucky, United States
| 
|}

Kickboxing record

Legend:

References

External links
 

Living people
1975 births
American male mixed martial artists
Heavyweight mixed martial artists
Mixed martial artists from Kentucky
Mixed martial artists utilizing karate
Mixed martial artists utilizing Brazilian jiu-jitsu
American male karateka
American male kickboxers
Heavyweight kickboxers
Sportspeople from Louisville, Kentucky
American practitioners of Brazilian jiu-jitsu
People awarded a black belt in Brazilian jiu-jitsu